Zavolzhsky (masculine), Zavolzhskaya (feminine), or Zavolzhskoye (neuter) is the name of several rural localities in Russia:
Zavolzhsky, Samara Oblast, a settlement in Bezenchuksky District of Samara Oblast
Zavolzhsky, Saratov Oblast, a settlement in Pugachyovsky District of Saratov Oblast
Zavolzhsky, Kalininsky District, Tver Oblast, a settlement in Kalininsky District of Tver Oblast
Zavolzhsky, Rzhevsky District, Tver Oblast, a settlement in Rzhevsky District of Tver Oblast
Zavolzhsky, Bykovsky District, Volgograd Oblast, a settlement in Kislovsky Selsoviet of Bykovsky District of Volgograd Oblast
Zavolzhsky, Nikolayevsky District, Volgograd Oblast, a settlement in Berezhnovsky Selsoviet of Nikolayevsky District of Volgograd Oblast
Zavolzhsky, Pallasovsky District, Volgograd Oblast, a settlement in Zavolzhsky Selsoviet of Pallasovsky District of Volgograd Oblast
Zavolzhskoye, a selo in Zavolzhsky Selsoviet of Kharabalinsky District of Astrakhan Oblast